Katie George may refer to:

Katie George (cosplayer) (born 1988), American cosplayer
Katie George (cricketer) (born 1999), English cricketer
Katie George (sportscaster) (born 1993), American sportscaster